The 2016 Brickyard 400, branded as Crown Royal presents the Combat Wounded Coalition 400 at the Brickyard, was a NASCAR Sprint Cup Series stock car race held on July 24, 2016 at Indianapolis Motor Speedway in Speedway, Indiana. As the 23rd running of the Brickyard 400, contested over 170 laps—extended from 160 laps due to an overtime finish, on the  speedway, it was the 20th race of the 2016 NASCAR Sprint Cup Series.

Kyle Busch scored his second career victory at the Brickyard, the race had four lead changes among different drivers and eight cautions for 31 laps, and one red flag for seven minutes and 45 seconds.

This is the first Brickyard 400 without Dale Earnhardt Jr. since the 1999 edition and the first Brickyard 400 without an Earnhardt in the starting lineup.

Also, this marked the final Brickyard 400 starts for 5-time Brickyard 400 winner Jeff Gordon and 2-time Brickyard 400 winner Tony Stewart.

Report

Background

The Indianapolis Motor Speedway, located in Speedway, Indiana, (an enclave suburb of Indianapolis) in the United States, is the home of the Indianapolis 500 and the Brickyard 400.

Constructed in 1909, it is the original speedway, the first racing facility so named. It has a permanent seating capacity estimated at 235,000 with infield seating raising capacity to an approximate 400,000. It is the highest-capacity sports venue in the world.

Entry list
The preliminary entry list for the race included 41 cars and was released on July 15, 2016 at 10:12 a.m. Eastern time. Dale Earnhardt Jr. was slated to run the race in the No. 88 Hendrick Motorsports Chevrolet, but concussion symptoms forced him to sit out and be replaced by Jeff Gordon.

Practice

First practice

Final practice

Qualifying
Busch said afterwards that the pole "means a lot to me and it means a lot to the guys on this team. To be able to sit on the pole here at Indy is something that I’ve always wanted to do. (Crew chief) Adam Stevens and the guys gave me a great piece this weekend.

After qualifying third, Tony Stewart said he wished he "could do a lap ... one more time and not clip the apron in (Turn) 4; I think we could have been on the pole. What we learned today for qualifying, we are going to have to take some of that and try to make a car a little better for tomorrow."

Making his first start since Homestead in November, Jeff Gordon – who qualified 21st subbing for Dale Earnhardt Jr. – said he was "much calmer than I was [Friday]. Usually, my heart is beating more for qualifying than it is for practice. But that wasn't the case [in practice]. I feel more relaxed and comfortable in the car."

Qualifying results

Race

First half
Under clear blue Indiana skies, Kyle Busch led the field to the green flag at 3:22 p.m. During the first lap, Tony Stewart used all of the real estate on the backstretch and made a power move under Denny Hamlin to take second. The first caution of the race flew on the fourth lap for Matt DiBenedetto blowing an engine on the frontstretch. He went on to finish 40th.

The race restarted on the ninth lap. Busch just pulled away from the field during this run. By lap 19, he pulled to a five and a half second lead over teammate Denny Hamlin. During the run, Stewart began falling from second to eighth. Martin Truex Jr. kicked off a round of green flag stops on lap 25. More cars followed suit the next lap. Busch pitted from the lead on lap 28 and handed it to Brad Keselowski. Kevin Harvick made an unscheduled stop on lap 32 for what he believed to be a flat tire. It turned out that the tire wasn't flat. Keselowski and Joey Logano pitted on lap 42 and the lead cycled back to Busch.

The second caution of the race flew on lap 52 after Greg Biffle suffered a right-front tire blowout and slammed the wall in turn 1. Logano opted not to pit under the caution and assumed the race lead.

The race restarted on lap 59. Busch ran down Logano to retake the lead on lap 63. A number of cars began hitting pit road on lap 84. Hamlin and Jimmie Johnson were tagged for speeding on pit road and were forced to serve a pass through penalty. Busch pitted on lap 87 and handed the lead to Carl Edwards. He pitted the next lap and the lead cycled back to Busch.

Second half

A number of cars began hitting pit road on lap 112. The third caution of the race came out on lap 120 for David Ragan blowing a left-front tire and slamming the wall head-on in turn 2. Tony Stewart and Jamie McMurray were tagged for speeding on pit road and restarted the race from the tail end of the field.

The race restarted with 33 laps to go. The fourth caution of the race flew with 30 laps to go for Regan Smith coming to a halt on the backstretch.

The race restarted with 26 laps to go. Debris in turn 1 brought out the fifth caution of the race with 10 laps to go. The top-five cars opted not to pit while the rest of the lead lap cars elected to hit pit road.

The race restarted with seven laps to go and the sixth caution of the race flew for a multi-car wreck in turn 1. It started when Edwards got loose and slammed into the wall, collecting drivers like Ryan Newman and Keselowski. “It felt like I just got tight down there,” Edwards said. "I had a little trouble there on the starts and I got down there, we were fighting really hard for the bottom and it felt like I got tight with whoever was on the outside of me. If indeed that is what happened, I apologize, that’s pretty frustrating. I don’t know if he came down or if I came up. It felt like I got in there and just scrubbed that right front. Hopefully a Toyota wins. I hate it for Stanley, Joe Gibbs Racing and everybody that was caught up in that wreck. It’s frustrating.” This brought out the red flag to ensue cleanup. The race resumed under caution shortly thereafter.

The race restarted on lap 159, with two laps to go in regulation. The seventh caution of the race flew half a lap later for a two-car wreck on the backstretch involving Trevor Bayne and Clint Bowyer.

Overtime

Attempt #1
The race restarted on lap 165 and the eighth caution of the race flew when Jamie McMurray slid down the access road in turn 1, coming back up onto the track and being hit by Ryan Newman.

Attempt #2
The race restarted on lap 169. Kyle Busch was leading at the finish and scored his second career victory at the Brickyard.

Post-race

Driver comments
Busch said afterwards that his "Toyota was awesome today, it was just so fast and able to get out front and stay out front. Not even some of my teammates could challenge. This was hooked up and on rails.” “The repeat-ability there was something I wasn’t looking forward to,” Busch added. “I certainly didn’t want one, let alone (four) of them. You never know what is going to happen on those restarts. There’s a lot of gamesmanship that kind of gets played, and there was a little bit of back and forth a little bit with the guys in the different grooves. I think I had Kenseth to my outside. I had Truex to my outside. I think I had Carl to my outside and then Joey Logano to my outside, so there were a lot of different characters that we had to deal with on the restarts. But I always felt like I could hit my marks and set sail each time.”

Race results

Race summary
 Lead changes: 4 among different drivers
 Cautions/Laps: 8 for 34
 Red flags: 1 for 7 minutes, 25 seconds
 Time of race: 3 hours, 17 minutes and 46 seconds
 Average speed:

Media

Television
NBC Sports covered the race on the television side. Rick Allen, Jeff Burton and Steve Letarte had the call in the booth for the race. Dave Burns, Mike Massaro, Marty Snider and Kelli Stavast reported from pit lane during the race.

Radio
Indianapolis Motor Speedway Radio Network and the Performance Racing Network jointly co-produced the radio broadcast for the race, which was simulcast on Sirius XM NASCAR Radio, and aired on IMS or PRN stations, depending on contractual obligations.  The lead announcers and two pit reporters were PRN staff, while the turns and two pit reporters were from IMS.

Standings after the race

Note: Only the first 16 positions are included for the driver standings.. – Driver has clinched a position in the Chase for the Sprint Cup.

References

2016 in sports in Indiana
2016 NASCAR Sprint Cup Series
2016 Brickyard 400
July 2016 sports events in the United States